This is a list of former United States Air Force installations.

Does not include United States Army Air Forces facilities closed before September 1947.

United States 

 See: North Warning System for a list of contractor-operated Distant Early Warning Line (DEW) radar stations in Greenland (Denmark), Canada and Alaska.

 See: Eastern Test Range for Air Force Auxiliary Bases established to support missile and rocket launches from Cape Canaveral Air Force Station during the 1950s and early 1960s. Central America and Caribbean 

 Panama 
 Albrook Air Force Base, Canal Zone, (Closed 1997)
 France Air Force Base, Canal Zone, (Closed 1949)
 Howard Air Force Base, Canal Zone, (Closed 1999)

 Puerto Rico 
 Ramey Air Force Base, Aguadilla, Puerto Rico (Closed 1971)
 Portion transferred to United States Coast Guard
 Renamed CGAS Borinquen (Active)

 Europe/Mediterranean/North Atlantic 
Includes bases in North Africa and the United Kingdom used by Strategic Air Command and bases used by the United States Air Forces in Europe (after 1947).  Non-flying minor Air Stations not included.

 Belgium/The Netherlands 
 Florennes Air Base, Belgium
 Used as BGM-109G Ground Launched Cruise Missile base, 1984–1989
 Soesterberg Air Base, Netherlands (Closed 1994)
 Woensdrecht Air Base, Netherlands
 Planned BGM-109G Ground Launched Cruise Missile base (Closed 1988, never made active)

 Eastern Europe 
 Air Bases in Bulgaria and Romania negotiated by diplomatic agreements for USAF use not included
 Mostar Airport,  Bosnia and Herzegovina (Closed 1997)
 Taszár Air Base, Hungary (Closed 2010)
 Tuzla Air Base, Bosnia and Herzegovina (Closed 2008)

 France 

 Bordeaux-Mérignac Air Base (Closed 1958)
 Chambley-Bussières Air Base (Closed 1967)
 Châteauroux-Déols Air Base (Closed 1967)
 Chaumont-Semoutiers Air Base
 Active USAFE use ended 1963, Reserve status until 1967
 Dreux-Louvilliers Air Base
 Active USAFE use ended 1962, Reserve status until 1966
 Étain-Rouvres Air Base
 Active USAFE use ended 1963, Reserve status until 1967

 Évreux-Fauville Air Base
 Active USAFE use ended 1964, Reserve status until 1967
 Laon-Couvron Air Base (Closed 1967)
 Paris-Orly Air Base (Closed 1967)
 Phalsbourg-Bourscheid Air Base
 Active USAFE use ended 1963, Reserve status until 1967
 Toul-Rosières Air Base (Closed 1967)

 Austria/Germany 
Includes Occupied Austria (1945–1955), Occupied Germany (1947–1949); West Germany (1949–1990), and Occupied Berlin (West Berlin) (1947–1990)

 652nd USAF Contingency Hospital, Donaueschingen (Closed early 1990s, redeveloped into apartments)
 Bitburg Air Base (Closed 1994)
 Erding Air Base
 Turned over to West German Air Force, 1960
 Remained in occasional use by USAFE until 1989
 Fürstenfeldbruck Air Base
 Turned over to West German Air Force, 1957
 Giebelstadt Air Base
 Turned over to United States Army, 1968
 Hahn Air Base (Closed 1994)
 Landsberg Air Base
 Turned over to West German Air Force, 1957
 Kaufbeuren Air Base
 Turned over to West German Air Force, 1957
 Munich-Riem Airport, returned to civil use, 1948

 Neubiberg Air Base
 Turned over to West German Air Force, 1957
 Frankfurt Airport, returned to civil use 1955
 USAF Rhein-Main Air Base (Closed 2005)
 Tempelhof Central Airport, Berlin, returned to civil use, 1994
 Tulln Air Base, Vienna, Austria
 Transferred to Austrian Police, 1955
 Wiesbaden Air Base
 Transferred to United States Army, 1976
 USAF facility (Lindsey Air Station), Closed 1993
 Wüschheim Air Station (Closed 1990)
 Known as "Site VI" for MGM-1 Matador/MGM-13 Mace tactical missiles 1958–1966
 Used as BGM-109G Ground Launched Cruise Missile base, 1985–1990
 Zweibrücken Air Base (Closed 1994)

 Iceland 
 Naval Air Station Keflavik, Iceland (Closed 2006)

 Denmark (Greenland) 
 Narsarsuaq Air Base, Greenland (Closed 1958)
 Sondrestrom Air Base, Greenland, (Closed 1992)
 Thule Air Base, Greenland, (Open 1943)

 Mediterranean 

 Ben Guerir Air Base, Morocco (Closed 1958)
 Boulhaut Air Base, Morocco (Closed 1963)
 Comiso Air Base, Italy
 Used as BGM-109G Ground Launched Cruise Missile base, 1983–1991
 Hellenikon Airport, Greece (Closed 1993)
 Iraklion Air Station, Crete, Greece (Closed 1993)

 Nouasseur Air Base, Morocco (Closed 1963)
 Pirinclik Air Base, Turkey (Closed 1997)
 Torrejón Air Base, Spain (Closed 1994)
 Sidi Slimane Air Base, Morocco (Closed 1963)
 Wheelus Air Base, Libya (Closed 1970)
 Zaragoza Air Base, Spain (Closed 1994)

 United Kingdom 

 RAF Alconbury (Active)
 RAF Bassingbourn (SAC deployments ended 1950)
 RAF Bentwaters (Closed by USAFE 1992)
 RAF Bovingdon (closed by SAC – 1960)
 RAF Brize Norton (SAC deployments ended 1966)
 RAF Bruntingthorpe (SAC deployments ended 1966)
 RAF Burtonwood
 SAC/USAFE operational use ended 1966
 Transferred to United States Army
 RAF Chelveston
 SAC deployments ended 1966
 Active USAFE use ended 1970. Airfield removed in 1977.  Remained as reserve storage and family housing base until 1992 as a satellite of RAF Alconbury.
 RAF Chicksands
 Used by USAF Security Service until 1997
 RAF Croughton
 Major USAF communications base
 RAF Daws Hill (Closed 1969)
 RAF East Kirkby (closed by SAC – 1958)
 RAF Greenham Common
 SAC deployments ended 1966, placed in reserve status by USAFE
 Used as BGM-109G Ground Launched Cruise Missile base, 1982–1991

 RAF Homewood Park (Hospital), (Closed by SAC 1957)
 RAF High Wycombe, (Closed by SAC 1965, Operated by USAFE til1 1992 and currently US Navy)
 RAF Lakenheath (Active)
 RAF Little Rissington (Closed by USAFE 1993)
 RAF Lindholme (Attached to RAF Brize Norton – closed by SAC – 1962)
 RAF Manston (Closed by USAFE 1961)
 RAF Marham (SAC deployments ended 1966)
 RAF Membury, (Closed by SAC 1954)
 RAF Mildenhall, (Current)
 RAF Molesworth
 Active USAFE use ended 1957, placed in reserve status
 Used as BGM-109G Ground Launched Cruise Missile base, 1986–1989
 Now auxiliary of RAF Alconbury, used by NATO Joint Analysis Centre
 RAF Scampton (SAC deployments ended 1966)
 RAF Sculthorpe
 Active use by USAFE ended 1962, remained as reserve base until 1992
 RAF Shepherds Grove, (Closed by USAFE 1958)
 RAF Stanstead-Monfitchet, (Closed by SAC 1955)
 RAF St Eval (SAC deployments ended 1966)
 RAF Sturgate, (Closed by SAC 1955)
 RAF South Ruislip (HQ, 3rd AF till moving to RAF Mildenhall 1972 / closed by USAFE)
 RAF Upper Heyford (closed by USAFE 1994)
 RAF Waddington (SAC deployments ended 1966)
 RAF West Drayton (closed by SAC – 1962)
 RAF West Ruislip (closed by USAFE 1975 – operated by US Navy till 2008)
 RAF Wethersfield
 Active USAFE use ended 1970, remained as reserve base until 1992
 RAF Woodbridge (Closed by USAFE 1992)

 Lend-Lease bases 
Caribbean Lend-Lease bases inactivated in 1949, however 99-year lease signed in 1940 remains in effect, United States has right of return until 2039.

 Atkinson AFB, British Guiana (Closed 1949)
 Beane AFB, St. Lucia (Closed 1949)
 Carlsen AFB Trinidad (Closed 1949)
 Coolidge AFB, Antigua (Closed 1949)
 Ernest Harmon AFB, Newfoundland (Closed 1966) (now Stephenville International Airport)
 Goose AB, Labrador (Closed 1973)
 Transferred to Canadian Forces, now CFB Goose Bay
 Last USAF units inactivated 1976
 Kindley AFB, Bermuda
 Transferred to United States Navy, 1970
 Renamed NAS Bermuda (Closed 1995)

 McAndrew AFB, Argentia, Newfoundland
 Transferred to United States Navy, 1955
 Renamed NAS Argentia, then NAVSTA Argentina (Closed 1994)
 Pepperell AFB, St. John's, Newfoundland (closed 1961)
 Vernam AFB, Jamaica (Closed 1949)
 Waller AFB, Trinidad (Closed 1949)

 Southwest and Central Asia 
Only bases publicly disclosed by United States Air Forces Central listed. Current status is undetermined unless noted.

 Arabian Peninsula 

Jordan
 H-4 Air Base, Jordan (Closed 2003)
 Shaheed Mwaffaq Air Base, Jordan (Closed 1991)
 Kuwait
 Ahmad al-Jaber Air Base, Kuwait (Closed 2003, Re-established 2014)
 Saudi Arabia
 King Abdul Aziz Air Base, Dhahran, Saudi Arabia (Closed 2003)
 King Khalid Air Base, Khamis Mushait, Saudi Arabia (Closed 2003)
 King Faisal Naval Base, Tabuk, Saudi Arabia (Closed 2003)
 King Fahd International Airport, Dammam, Saudi Arabia (Closed 1991)
 Prince Sultan Air Base, Al Kharj, Saudi Arabia (Closed 2003)
 Riyadh Air Base, Saudi Arabia (Closed 2003)
 Taif Air Base, Saudi Arabia (Closed 2003)
Oman
 Masirah Air Base, Masirah Island, Oman (Inactive)
 Seeb International Airport, Muscat, Oman  (Closed 2002)
Qatar
 Doha International Airport, Qatar (Closed 1991)
United Arab Emirates
 Al Ain International Airport, Al Ain, United Arab Emirates (Closed 1991)
 Al Banteen Air Base, Abu Dhabi, United Arab Emirates (Closed 1991)
 Al Minhad Air Base, Dubai, United Arab Emirates (Closed 1991)
 Sharjah International Airport, Sharjah, United Arab Emirates (Closed 1991)

 Central Asia 

 Bamyan Airfield (Bamian), Afghanistan
 Fayzabad Airport, Afghanistan
 Herat Airfield**, Afghanistan
 Jalalabad Airfield**
 Now: Jalalabad Airport, Afghanistan
 Karshi-Khanabad Air Base**, Uzbekistan (Closed 2005)
 Khowst Airfield, Afghanistan
 Other names: Chapman Airfield

 Konduz Airfield**, Afghanistan
 Mazar-e Sharif Airfield**, Afghanistan
 Maimana Airfield (Meymanh), Afghanistan
 Sheberghan Airfield, Afghanistan
 Taloqan Airfield
 Now: Taloqan Airport, Afghanistan
Transit Center at Manas, Kyrgyzstan (Closed 2014) 

Note:  Former Soviet Air Forces bases **

 Iraq 

 Al-Asad Air Base (Qadisiyah AB)
 US Military Designations: FOB/Camp Al-Asad; FOB/Objective Webster
 United States Marine Corps Airfield (Closed 2010)
 Al-Bakr Air Base
 Joint Base Balad
 332d Air Expeditionary Wing  Supported United States Forces-Iraq transition from combat to stability operations, and help strengthen the capabilities of a sovereign, secure and self-reliant Iraq.
 Closed December 2011.
 Al-Iskandariyah New Air Base
 US Military Designations: Camp/FLB Dogwood; FOB Chosin
 United States Marine Corps Camp (Closed 2008)
 Al-Sahara Air Base
 US Military Designations: Camp/FOB Speicher; Camp/FLB Sycamore
 Active United States Army Contingency Operating Base
 Al-Taji Army Airfield (Al Taji Camp)
 US Military Designations: Camp Cooke; Camp Taji; FOB Gunner
 United States Army Forward Operating Base, turned over to Iraqi Army 2010
 Al-Taqaddum Air Base
 US Military Designations: FOB Guardian City, FOB Ridgeway, QBJ Redskins
 United States Army Forward Operating Base, Current status undetermined
 Baghdad International Airport
 Airport returned to Iraqi Civil Control 2004; full operations resumed 2008/2009
 Sather Air Base Victory Base Complex
 321st Air Expeditionary Wing407th Air Expeditionary Group  Trained, advised, and assisted the Iraqi Air Force to develop as a professional and credible regional airpower.
 Closed December 2011.
 Baquba Air Base
 US Military Designations: Camp Boom; Camp/FOB Gabe; Camp Freedom; Camp/FOB Warhorse; FOB Scunion; FOB Comanche
 United States Army Forward Operating Base, Current status undetermined
 H-3 Air Base
 Former Iraqi Air Force hardened "Super Base"
 Consisted of H-3 Main; H-3 NW; H-3 SW and H-3 Highway (Abandoned 2003)
 Camp Korean Village/Camp "KV" (USMC)
 Habbaniyah Air Base
 Former RAF Habbaniya (1936–1959)
 US Military Designation: Camp/FOB Manhattan
 Active United States Army Forward Operating Base
 Irbil Air Base (Closed 1991)
 Now: Arbil International Airport
 Jalibah Southeast Air Base (Abandoned 1991)
 US Military Designations: Camp/LSA Viper
 United States Marine Corps Camp, 2003
 K-1 Air Base
 US Military Designations: COB K-1
 United States Army Contingency Operating Base, turned over to Iraqi Army 2011
 K-2 Air Base (Bayji AB)
 Former Iraqi Air Force hardened "Super Base"
 US Military Designation: Camp Lancer
 United States Marine Corps Camp, Current status undetermined
 Karbale Northeast Air Base (Closed 1991)
 Now: Karbala Northeast Airport (Under development)

 Kirkuk Air Base (also known as Kirkuk Regional Air Base)
 US Military Designations: Camp Renegade; Camp/FOB Warrior
 Active United States Army Contingency Operating Base
 US Military Designations: Camp Chesty (USMC); Camp/FOB Delta (USA)
 Mosul Air Base (Al-Gayyar AB, Mawsil AB)
 Former Iraqi Air Force hardened "Super Base"
 US Military Designations: Camp Diamondback; Camp Claiborne; Camp Marez (USA), USAF use 2003–2007
 Now: Mosul International Airport (Under civil control, 2007, US use undetermined)
 Kut Al Hayy Air Base
 US Military Designation: Camp Chesty
 United States Marine Corps Camp (Closed 2008)
 Muthenna Air Base
 Former Iraqi Air Force hardened "Super Base"
 US Military Designations: FOB Headhunter; Camp Independence
 Active United States Army training facility for Iraqi police and soldiers.
 Najaf Airbase (Closed 2008)
 Now: Al Najaf International Airport (2008)
 Qalat Sikar Air Base
 Former Iraqi Air Force hardened "Super Base"
 US Military Designations: Camp Basilone; Camp Fenway;
 United States Marine Corps Camp (Closed 2008)
 Qayyarah Airfield West (Saddam AB)
 Former Iraqi Air Force hardened "Super Base"
 US Military Designations:  FOB Endurance; FOB Q-West
 Active United States Army facility
 Rasheed Air Base (Al-Rashid Military Camp)
 US Military Designations: Camp/FOB Falson; Camp Loyalty; Camp Al-Saqr; Camp Muleskinner; Camp Cuervo; Camp Rustamiyah; Camp Redcatcher/Redcatcher Field; Engineer Base Anvil
 Active United States Army facility
 Sahl Sinjar Air Base (Abandoned 1991)
 US Military Designations: Camp Sinjar
 United States Army facility closed 2004, now abandoned.
 Samarra East Air Base (Al Bakr Airfield)
 Former Iraqi Air Force hardened "Super Base"
 US Military Designations: FOB McKenzie, FOB Pacesetter
 Active United States Army facility
 Shaykh Mazhar Air Base (Abandoned 2003)
 Former Iraqi Air Force hardened "Super Base"
 Location of Salman Pak facility biological and chemical weapons site.
 Tal Ashtah Air Base
 US Military Designation: FOB Grant, LSA Adder
 United States Army facility closed 2004, now abandoned.
 Tall Afar Air Base
 US Military Designation: FOB Tall Afar
 Active United States Army facility
 Tallil Air Base
 Former Iraqi Air Force hardened "Super Base"
 US Military Designation: Camp Adder
 Active United States Army facility
 Tikrit South Air Base
 US Military Designation: FOB Remagen
 Active United States Army facility, closed 2011
 Tuz Khurmatu Air Base
 US Military Designation: FOB Bernstein
 United States Army Contingency Operating Base, turned over to Iraqi Army 2006

Seized Iraqi air bases not used by the United States:

 Al Fathah Air Base  (Abandoned 2003)
 Former Iraqi Air Force hardened "Super Base"
 Al Muhammadi Air Base (Abandoned 2003)
 Amarah Air Base (Abandoned 1991)
 Ar Rumaylah Southwest Air Base (Abandoned 1991)
 H-1 Air Base
 Former Iraqi Air Force hardened "Super Base" (Abandoned 2003)
 H-2 Air Base
 Former Iraqi Air Force hardened "Super Base" (Abandoned 2003)
 Khan Bani Sad Air Base (Closed 1991)

 Ruwayshid Air Base (Abandoned 2003)
 Shaibah Air Base (Shaibah Airport)
 Under Iraqi civil control, 2006, civil general aviation airport.
 Safwan Air Base
 Site of 1991 Operation Desert Storm Ceasefire (Abandoned 1991)
 Salum Air Base (Abandoned 1991)
 Tikrit East Air Base (Abandoned 2003)
 Ubaydah Bin Al Jarrah Air Base
 Former Iraqi Air Force hardened "Super Base"
 Airfield intact, support base abandoned 2003

Note: Former Iraqi Air Force "Super Base" designation was given to airfields with numerous above-ground hardened aircraft-shelters and underground facilities that could shelter between four and ten aircraft on average. During Operation Iraqi Freedom in 2003, the Iraqi Air Force essentially stood down except in a few cases of self-defence against US and British air strikes.  Despite their size – or exactly because of it – most of these airfields were barely defended in 2003 and with a few exceptions, the "Super Base" facilities were captured intact with very little damage.

Most Iraqi Air Force aircraft in various conditions from being flyable to abandoned hulks (a large number were buried) were seized by the United States and its coalition partners, however it is known that Syrian and Iranian agents were busy removing radars and items from the avionics bays and cockpits.  By autumn 2004 only some 20–25 unserviceable wrecks of Iraqi aircraft and helicopters were left scattered around the many Iraqi airfields. The destruction of the Iraqi Air Force was probably one of the most complete such actions in the history of military aviation.

Although most of the former "Super Bases" have been de-militarized and today are abandoned facilities being reclaimed by the desert, a few were refurbished and were subsequently used by Army, Air Force and Marine units.  They may form the organization of a new Iraqi Air Force equipped with surplus United States F-16, C-130 and other light aircraft.

 Western Pacific 
 See Far East Air Force Korean airfields (K-sites) for airfields established in the Korean Peninsula during the Korean War (1950–1953) See Southeast Asia section for USAF bases used during the Vietnam War (1960–1976)''

 Ashiya Air Base, Japan (Closed 1960)
 Chitose Air Base, Japan (Closed 1957)
 Cheong Ju Air Base, Republic of Korea (Closed 1980)
 Clark Air Base, Philippines (Closed 1991)
 Fuchu Air Base, Japan (Closed 1957)
 Pusan West Air Base, Republic of Korea (Closed 1975)
 Harmon Air Force Base, Guam (Closed 1949)
 Itazuke Air Base, Japan (Closed 1972)
 Johnson Air Base, Japan (Closed 1973)
 Johnston Island Air Force Base, Johnston Atoll, US Minor Outlying Islands (Closed 1980, reopened 1999, Closed 2005)
 Kimhae Air Base, Republic of Korea (Closed 1980)
 Komaki Air Base, Japan (Closed 1958)
 Kume Air Station, Japan (Closed 1973)
 Kwang Ju Air Base*, Republic of Korea (Closed 1992)

 Miho Air Base, Japan (Closed 1957)
 Miyako Air Station (Closed 1973)
 Naha Air Base, Occupied Okinawa (Closed 1971)
 Central Field, Occupied Iwo Jima (Closed 1968)
 Northwest Guam Air Force Base, Guam (Closed 1949)
 South Field, Occupied Iwo Jima (Closed 1955)
 Northwest Guam Air Force Base, Guam (Closed 1949)
 Okino Erabu Air Station
 Sacheon Air Base, Republic of Korea (Closed 1977)
 Suwon Air Base *, Republic of Korea (Closed 1992)
 Tachikawa Air Base, Japan (Closed 1977)
 Taegu Air Base *, Republic of Korea (Closed 1992)
 Tsuiki Air Base, Japan (Closed 1957)
 Wake Island Airfield, Wake Island, US Minor Outlying Islands (Transferred to US Army, 1993)
 Yechon Air Base, Republic of Korea (Closed 1975)
 Yozadake Air Station, Japan (Closed 1973)

* In 1992 the US government changed the status of three US air bases in South Korea. Kwang Ju Air Base, Suwon Air Base and Taegu Air Base had previously been announced as ending operations, but would instead operate at reduced levels. 15 USAF personnel were assigned to each base, and reside in former officer quarters, which was basically a small apartment.  USAF aircraft transit each base, with the personnel providing transient support and maintain USAF equipment stored at each base in case of an emergency for reactivation in which ACC and other units would deploy to them.  In addition, the ROK use the airfields as an air base and civil airport.

Taiwan 

 Chiayi Air Base, Taiwan (US departed ?)
 Ching Chuan Kang Air Base, Taiwan (US departed 1979)
 Lo Shan Radar Site, Taiwan (US departed ?)
 Makung Island, Taiwan (US departed ?)
 O Laun Pi, Taiwan (US departed ?)
 Shihmen Air Station, Taiwan (US departed ?)
 Shu Linkou Air Station, Taiwan (US departed ?)
 Sung Shan Air Base, Taiwan (US departed ?)
 Tainan Air Base, Taiwan (US departed ?)
 Taipei Air Station, Taiwan (US departed ?)
 Takangshan, Taiwan (US departed ?)
 Taoyuan Air Base, Taiwan (US departed ?)
 Hsinchu Air Base, Taiwan (US departed ?)

Note: As part of a mutual defense pact, the Republic of China (Taiwan) permitted United States forces, to utilize many ROC bases between 1957–1979.  Deployments ended in 1979 as part of the drawdown of United States military forces in Asia after the end of the Vietnam War and the United States' transfer of diplomatic relations from the Republic of China (Taiwan) to the People's Republic of China in 1979.  For more information, see United States Taiwan Defense Command and 327th Air Division.

Southeast Asia 

 Bien Hoa Air Base, Republic of Vietnam (Closed 1973)
 Binh Thuy Air Base, Republic of Vietnam (Closed 1971)
 Cam Ranh Air Base, Republic of Vietnam (Closed 1972)
 Da Nang Air Base, Republic of Vietnam (Closed 1973)
 Don Muang Royal Thai Air Force Base, Thailand, (Closed 1970)
 Korat Royal Thai Air Force Base, Thailand, (Closed 1975)
 Nakhon Phanom Royal Thai Navy Base, Thailand, (Closed 1976)
 Nha Trang Air Base, Republic of Vietnam (Closed 1971)
 Phu Cat Air Base, Republic of Vietnam (Closed 1971)

 Pleiku Air Base, Republic of Vietnam (Closed 1971)
 Phan Rang Air Base, Republic of Vietnam (Closed 1972)
 Takhli Royal Thai Air Force Base, Thailand, (Closed 1971, Reopened 1972–1974)
 Tan Son Nhut Air Base, Republic of Vietnam (Closed 1973)
 Tuy Hoa Air Base, Republic of Vietnam (Closed 1970)
 U-Tapao Royal Thai Navy Airfield, Thailand, (Closed 1976)**
 Ubon Royal Thai Air Force Base, Thailand, (Closed 1974)
 Udorn Royal Thai Air Force Base, Thailand, (Closed 1976)

** Note: Although active USAF use at U-Tapao ended in 1976, USAF and other DoD personnel have been temporarily deployed to the base for contingency operations in South Asia in the years since.  Also U-Tapao supports various Foreign Military Sales in South Asia and DoD military personnel assigned to United States diplomatic postings in the region.

See also

Lists of military installations
List of Royal Air Force stations
List of Soviet Air Force bases

References

External links

USAF, Airman Magazine, The Book 2009, Facilities Listing
Global Security, US military facilities
US airports (for IATA codes, etc.)

 
USA former
Installations
Air Force